Lees Brook Community School (previously Lees Brook Sports College) is a co-educational secondary school and sixth form located in the Chaddesden area of Derby, in the English county of Derbyshire.

Previously a foundation school administered by Derby City Council, Lees Brook converted to with academy status in September 2011. However the school continues to coordinate with Derby City Council for admissions. The school moved to a new building on the same site in November 2014.

Lees Brook Community School offers GCSEs, BTECs and NCFEs as programmes of study for pupils. The school also operates a vocational sixth form provision.

References

External links
Lees Brook Community School official website

Secondary schools in Derby
Academies in Derby